Montgeron-Crosne is a railway station in Montgeron, Essonne, Île-de-France, France. The station was opened in 1995 and is on the Paris–Marseille railway. The station is served by the RER Line D, which is operated by SNCF. The station serves the communes of Montgeron and Crosne.

Station info
Situated at an altitude at 44 meters above sea level, the station is on the 17.45 kilometer point of the Paris-Marseille railway, between the stations of Villeneuve-Saint-Georges and Yerres. The station served 3,526,200 people in 2014.

Montgeron-Crosne station main building was under renovation, and is finished now. SNCF offered free rides from Montgeron-Crosne to Gare de Lyon during the construction time.

Train services
The following services serve the station:

Local services (RER D) Goussainville – Saint-Denis – Gare de Lyon – Villeneuve-Saint-Georges – Montgeron-Crosne – Combs-la-Ville–Quincy – Melun
Local services (RER D) Gare de Lyon – Maison Alfort-Alfortville – Villeneuve-Saint-Georges – Montgeron-Crosne – Combs-la-Ville–Quincy – Melun

References

External links

 
 

Railway stations in Essonne
Réseau Express Régional stations
Railway stations in France opened in 1995